Northside Presbyterian Church is a historic Presbyterian church at 923 Mississippi Avenue in Chattanooga, Tennessee, affiliated with the Presbyterian Church USA.

The congregation was founded in 1886, and its first building was completed in 1888.

The church's current Greek Revival building, completed in 1916 at a cost of $30,000, was designed by Reuben Harrison Hunt. It is his only Greek Revival design in Chattanooga. The building includes a church school annex added in 1926 and an education building added in 1958. In the 1960s, the sanctuary was remodeled. The building was added to the National Register of Historic Places in 1980. It underwent major renovations in the 1980s and 1990s.

References

External links
Official website

Presbyterian churches in Tennessee
Churches on the National Register of Historic Places in Tennessee
Churches completed in 1916
20th-century Presbyterian church buildings in the United States
Churches in Chattanooga, Tennessee
National Register of Historic Places in Chattanooga, Tennessee